Dalongdong, or Toalongpong (and variants 大浪泵/大隆同), is an old village in historical Taipei located near the narrows of the confluence of the Keelung and Tamsui Rivers. The district has since been merged with the newer Twatutia district in the south during the Qing dynasty to form Datong District.

The village, officially created in 1853 (3rd year of the Xianfeng Emperor), covered the area extending from the Chen Teacher's abode and beyond the area of sishisikan (四十四坎) and the Taipei Confucius Temple. During Japanese rule, the villages of Twatutia, Toalongpong, and Bangka were combined with the walled city of Taipeh (in present-day Zhongzheng District) and incorporated into present-day Taipei city. Although this district now exists only historically, its name still officially remains in the Dalongdong Baoan Temple and on bus numbers 303 and 669 of the Taipei bus system.

Name
Although the history of the village likely preceded Dutch Formosa rule, its existence was first recorded during this time as Pourompon (from the Basay language). This gave rise to the names Paronpon, Daronpon and other variants, when the area came under Qing dynasty rule. The name was once again changed in 1802 (7th year of Jiaqing Emperor), by settlers from Tong'an District in Xiamen. It was during this period that the Baoan Temple was first constructed. The name finally settled in its present form during the reign of the Daoguang Emperor (1820-1850) when further settlement occurred in the area.

Gallery

References

External links
Toalongpong Bao'an temple
Sishisikan

History of Taipei
Neighbourhoods in Taipei